Miles Christi (English: Soldier of Christ, postnominal abbreviation MC) is a Clerical Religious Order in the Catholic Church founded in the Archdiocese of La Plata, Argentina. Miles Christi focus on the Spirituality of Saint Ignatius of Loyola and retreats, conferences, catechism and spiritual direction.

Foundation 
The order was formally established as a Public Clerical Association of the Faithful in the Archdiocese of La Plata, Argentina on the 20th of December 1994. On the 11th of February 1999, Miles Christi was elevated to the status of Clerical Religious Order. In 2000, Miles Christi arrived in South Lyon, Michigan by invite of Cardinal Adam J. Maida. Then arrived in San Diego, California and, in 2022, they've found their 3rd US house in Denver, Colorado.  On the 21st of November 2020, the first US-born Miles Christi priest was ordained by Archbishop Allen H. Vigneron at the Sweetest Heart of Mary Church in Detroit, Michigan.

References 

Catholic religious orders established in the 20th century
Sexual abuse scandals in Catholic orders and societies